Alexandrescu is a Romanian surname. Notable people with the surname include:

Andrei Alexandrescu (born 1969), Romanian-American computer programmer
Grigore Alexandrescu, poet
Vasile Alexandrescu Urechia, historian and politician

See also 
 Alexe (name)
 Alexandreni (disambiguation)

Romanian-language surnames
Patronymic surnames
Surnames from given names